William Sturgeon (22 May 1783 – 4 December 1850) was an English physicist and inventor who made the first electromagnets, and invented the first practical British electric motor.

Early life 
Sturgeon was born on 22 May 1783 in Whittington, near Carnforth, Lancashire, and became apprenticed to a shoemaker.

Career
Sturgeon joined the army in 1802 and taught himself mathematics and physics. In 1824 he became lecturer in Science and Philosophy at the East India Company's Military Seminary at Addiscombe, Surrey, and in the following year he exhibited his first electromagnet. He displayed its power by lifting nine pounds with a seven-ounce piece of iron wrapped with wire through which a current from a single battery was sent.

In 1832 he was appointed to the lecturing staff of the Adelaide Gallery of Practical Science in London, where he first demonstrated the DC electric motor incorporating a commutator.

In 1836 he established the journal Annals of Electricity, Magnetism and Chemistry, and in the same year he invented a galvanometer.

Sturgeon was a close associate of John Peter Gassiot and Charles Vincent Walker, and the three were instrumental in founding the London Electrical Society in 1837.

In 1840 he became superintendent of the Royal Victoria Gallery of Practical Science in Manchester. He formed a close social circle with John Davies, one of the Gallery's promoters, and Davies's student James Prescott Joule, a circle that eventually extended to include Edward William Binney and the surgeon John Leigh. The Gallery closed in 1842, and he earned a living by lecturing and demonstrating.

In 1843 he started the monthly journal, The Annals of Philosophical Discovery and Monthly Reporter of the Progress of Practical Science; issue 1 of volume 1 is dated July 1843. Each month's issue contains a mixture of original "long" papers (over 5 pages long), republished papers from foreign journals (translated where necessary) and shorter articles. However, the journal did not prove successful, and ceased publication at the end of volume 1, in December 1843. This single volume is archived at Internet.org.

Death and burial
Sturgeon died in Prestwich, Lancashire (now in Greater Manchester) on 4 December 1850. He is buried there, in the churchyard of the St Mary the Virgin: he is identified on his grave slab as "William Sturgeon – The Electrician".

References

Bibliography 

1783 births
1850 deaths
English inventors
People of the Industrial Revolution
English physicists
People from Carnforth
British East India Company people